CHNL (Radio NL) is a radio station in Kamloops, British Columbia, Canada. The station, owned by the Stingray Group since 2018, airs a classic hits format with some talk and sports at 610 on the AM dial. The station launched on May 1, 1970. CHNL has been a mix of news/talk station since September 2006 and a classic hits station since April 2014. Prior to it, the station aired an adult Contemporary format and branded as a "lite hits" station in the 1980s.

610 AM is a regional broadcast frequency. There are three stations in Canada on this frequency.

On April 25, 2009, CHNL received CRTC approval to add a transmitter in Merritt at 1230 kHz. The transmitter took over the AM frequency of Merritt's local radio station CJNL, which converted to 101.1 MHz and now broadcasts with the call sign CKMQ-FM. 1230 kHz went off-air for good on September 15, 2020 when the land owner did not renew the lease on the transmitter property.

Rebroadcasters

Former logo

References

External links
Radio NL
 

HNL
Radio stations established in 1970
HNL
1970 establishments in British Columbia
HNL